QUnit is a JavaScript unit testing framework. Originally developed for testing jQuery, jQuery UI and jQuery Mobile, it is a generic framework for testing any JavaScript code. It supports client-side environments in web browsers, and server-side (e.g. Node.js).

QUnit's assertion methods follow the CommonJS unit testing specification, which itself was influenced to some degree by QUnit.

History 
John Resig originally developed QUnit as part of jQuery. In 2008 it was extracted from the jQuery unit test code to form its project and became known as "QUnit". This allowed others to start using it for writing their unit tests. While the initial version of QUnit used jQuery for interaction with the DOM, a rewrite in 2009 made QUnit completely standalone.

Usage and examples 
 QUnit.module(string) - Defines a module, a grouping of one or more tests.
 QUnit.test(string, function) - Defines a test.
QUnit uses a set of assertion method to provide semantic meaning in unit tests:
 assert.ok(boolean, string) - Asserts that the provided value casts to boolean true.
 assert.equal(value1, value2, message) - Compares two values, using the double-equal operator.
 assert.deepEqual(value1, value2, message) - Compares two values based on their content, not just their identity.
 assert.strictEqual(value1, value2, message) - Strictly compares two values, using the triple-equal operator.

A basic example would be as follows:

QUnit.test('a basic test example', function (assert) {
  var obj = {};

  assert.ok(true, 'Boolean true');       // passes
  assert.ok(1, 'Number one');            // passes
  assert.ok(false, 'Boolean false');     // fails

  obj.start = 'Hello';
  obj.end = 'Ciao';
  assert.equal(obj.start, 'Hello', 'Opening greet'); // passes
  assert.equal(obj.end, 'Goodbye', 'Closing greet'); // fails
});

See also 

 List of unit testing frameworks
 Jasmine
JavaScript framework
JavaScript library

References

External links 
 
 

JavaScript programming tools
Unit testing frameworks
Free software programmed in JavaScript